The following is a timeline of the history of Carmel-by-the-Sea, California, United States.

See also
 History of Carmel-by-the-Sea
 List of mayors of Carmel-by-the-Sea, California
 List of Historic Buildings in Carmel-by-the-Sea

References

External links

 Digital Public Library of America with items related to Carmel-by-the-Sea, California
 History Timeline of Carmel-by-the-Sea

 
Cities in Monterey County, California
Populated coastal places in California
Populated places established in 1902
1902 establishments in California
Incorporated cities and towns in California